John Jay Carton (November 8, 1856August 26, 1934) was the Speaker of the Michigan House of Representatives from 1901 to 1904.

Early life 
Carton was born on November 8, 1856 in Clayton Township, Genesee County, Michigan to parents John and Ann Carton. Carton had 13 siblings. Carton was of Irish ancestry.

Career 
Carton was admitted to the bar on August 21, 1844. He became legal partners with George H. Durand. Carton was sworn in to the Michigan House of Representatives on January 4, 1899. He would serve until 1904, becoming Speaker of the Michigan House of Representatives in 1901. From 1907 to 1908, Carton was a delegate to Michigan state constitutional convention from the 13th district.

Personal life 
Carton married Addie C. Pierson on November 22, 1898 in Ukiah, California. Carton was a Freemason.

Death 
Carton died on August 26, 1934 in Flint, Genesee County, Michigan.

References 

1856 births
1934 deaths
American Freemasons
Speakers of the Michigan House of Representatives
Republican Party members of the Michigan House of Representatives
People from Genesee County, Michigan
19th-century American politicians
20th-century American politicians